Kamban College of Arts and Science for Women, is a women's general degree college located in Tiruvannamalai, Tamil Nadu. The college is affiliated with Thiruvalluvar University. This college offers different courses in arts, commerce and science.

Departments

Science
Physics
Chemistry
Mathematics
Microbiology
Computer Science

Arts and Commerce
Tamil
English
Physical Education
Business Administration
Commerce

Accreditation
The college is  recognized by the University Grants Commission (UGC).

References

External links

Colleges affiliated to Thiruvalluvar University
Academic institutions formerly affiliated with the University of Madras